Steenbergen or Van Steenbergen is a Dutch and Belgian toponymic surname, indicating an origin in any number of places called "stone hills", like the city of Steenbergen, North Brabant or the village  Steenbergen in Drenthe. People with the surname include:

Dylan Steenbergen (born 1987), Canadian football offensive lineman
Jan van Steenbergen (born 1970), Dutch linguist, journalist, translator and interpreter
Kathleen Ann Steenberge (born 1957), American Democratic politician from Pennsylvania
Marrit Steenbergen (born 2000), Dutch swimmer
Niel Steenbergen (1911–1997), Dutch sculptor, painter and medalist
Piet Steenbergen (1928–2010), Dutch football midfielder 
Quinta Steenbergen (born 1985), Dutch volleyball player
Rik Van Steenbergen (1924–2003), Belgian cyclist
Memorial Rik Van Steenbergen, a single-day road bicycle race

See also
Steenberg (surname)
Steenberghe
Mary Steenburgen (born 1953), American actress

References

Dutch-language surnames
Toponymic surnames